Route 112S or Highway 112S can refer to multiple roads:

United States
  U.S. Route 112S (former)
  Arkansas Highway 112 Spur (a.k.a. Arkansas Highway 112S)